NPTC may refer to 
National Park Travelers Club
National Private Truck Council
National Proficiency Tests Council, specialists for agricultural land based qualifications in the UK
Neath Port Talbot College, further education institution in Wales, United Kingdom